is a Japanese voice actress.

Filmography

Anime
Cyborg Kuro-chan (1999) – Pooly, Nyan Nyan Army No. 2/Spyder, Lily
Hamtaro (2000) – Mimi (Momo Iwata)
Gate Keepers (2000) – Ayako Isagai
Kirby: Right Back at Ya! (2001) – Princess Rona
Little Snow Fairy Sugar (2001) – Jan
Super GALS! Kotobuki Ran (2001) – Kasumi Tsukino
Chrono Crusade (2003) – Shader
Mobile Suit Gundam SEED Destiny (2004) – Conille Almeta
Elemental Gelade (2005) – Rerea
Fushigiboshi no Futagohime (2005) – Nacchi
Disgaea (2006) – Flonne
Ouran High School Host Club (2006) – Hinako Tsuwabuki
Les Misérables: Shōjo Cosette (2007) – Éponine
Major: Yūjō no Winning Shot (2008) – Kaoru
Yo-kai Watch (2014) – Meramelion, Robonyan, Gabunyan, Orochi
Major 2nd (2018–20) – Kaoru Shigeno

Video games
Street Fighter: The Movie (1995) – Chun-Li, Cammy
Street Fighter Zero 2 (1996) – Sakura Kasugano
Super Puzzle Fighter II X (1996) – Sakura Kasugano
Marvel Super Heroes vs. Street Fighter (1997) – Sakura Kasugano, Kei Chitose
Pocket Fighter (1997) – Sakura Kasugano, Kei Chitose
Rival Schools: United by Fate (1997) – Sakura Kasugano
Street Fighter Zero 3 (1998) – Sakura Kasugano
Marvel vs. Capcom 2: New Age of Heroes (2000) – Sakura Kasugano, Kei Chitose
Capcom vs. SNK: Millennium Fight 2000 (2000) – Sakura Kasugano
Street Fighter EX3 (2000) – Sakura Kasugano
Capcom vs. SNK 2: Millionaire Fighting 2001 (2001) – Sakura Kasugano
Capcom Fighting Jam (2004) – Sakura Kasugano
Namco × Capcom (2005) – Sakura Kasugano, Hoover (Baby Head)
Tales of Innocence (2007) – Iria Animi
Tales of the Rays (2017) – Iria Animi
Disgaea RPG (2019) – Flonne

Unknown date
Disgaea: Hour of Darkness – Flonne
Disgaea 2: Cursed Memories – Flonne, Masked Woman
Disgaea 3: Absence of Justice – Flonne
Makai Kingdom – Flonne
Phantom Brave – Flonne
Trinity Universe – Flonne

Drama CDsGetBackers (xxxx) – GabrielSoul Eater (xxxx) – Blair

DubbingFast Food Nation'' – Alice (Avril Lavigne)

References

External links
 

20th-century Japanese actresses
21st-century Japanese actresses
1973 births
Living people
Japanese video game actresses
Japanese voice actresses